Several ships have been named City of York, including:

 , a three-masted full-rigged ship, later barque, built in 1869 and wrecked in 1899
 , a passenger-cargo liner of Ellerman Lines, scrapped in 1937
 . a passenger-cargo liner, built in 1953, and later the ferry Mediterranean Sky

See also 
List of ships named City of New York

References

 
 

Ship names